Pepandungan is a village in Baraka district, Enrekang Regency in South Sulawesi province, Indonesia. Its population is 1208.

Climate
Pepandungan has a subtropical highland climate (Cfb) with heavy to very heavy rainfall from November to June and moderate rainfall from July to October.

References

 Populated places in South Sulawesi